Ginter Gawlik (born 5 December 1930 in Borsigwerk, a district of Zabrze; died 22 August  2005 in Würzburg, Germany) was a Polish soccer player, defender and midfielder. He spent most of career playing for Polish team Górnik Zabrze.

Gawlik, who was not raised in Poland (until 1945, Zabrze, then called Hindenburg, belonged to Germany), started his career in the mid-1940s for the German team Reichsbahn SV Borsigwerk. After 1945, he played for Górnik Biskupice and in 1950 he moved to Górnik Zabrze, a powerhouse of Polish soccer. While playing for Zabrze the team won 5 Polish football championships (late 1950s and early 1960s). Also, he played for the Polish National Team scoring one goal in 7 games. His debut took place on 23 June 1957 in Chorzów, when Poland beat Soviet Union 2-1.

References

1930 births
2005 deaths
Górnik Zabrze players
Polish footballers
Poland international footballers
Sportspeople from Zabrze
Association football defenders
Association football midfielders